Koler Gaan is a 2019 Bengali film which was directed by Pranab Mukherjee and produced by Pritam Singh, Sushil Kumar Sharma under the banner of CR Production. It starred Paran Bandopadhyay, Chaiti Ghoshal, Kalyan Chatterjee. The film was released on 4 January 2019.

Plot
Chandrakanta, a 70 years old man stays with his family a son Chandan, daughter in law Sumitra and grandson Chanchal. Chandrakanta used to listen gramophone since childhood, Gramophone was gifted to his father late Chunnilal Mukherjee by the European director Martin Burn and company when he was leaving for England.

Cast 
Paran Bandopadhayay
Chaiti Ray Ghoshal
Kalyan Chatterjee
Bhaskar Banerjee

References

External links 

 

2010s Bengali-language films
Bengali-language Indian films